This article is a list of countries by the number of road motor vehicles per 1,000 inhabitants. This includes cars, vans, buses, freight and other trucks, but excludes two-wheelers.

List

See also
Car ownership
Automotive industry
List of countries by motor vehicle production
List of U.S. states by vehicles per capita
Peak car

References

countries by per capita values
Vehicles
Road transport by country